Meltdown is the second album by Canadian rock group GrimSkunk released in 1996. The title of the song P.C.P. is an acronym for Problème de Consommation Personnelle meaning personal consumption problem related to drug use and features Uncle Costa and Shantal Arroyo on lead vocals. A video was made for No Sympathy. The songs Lord Ogre and Fat Al's Illness are rerecorded versions from the Fatal Illness days, the latter being a wordplay on the band's early name.

Track listing 
Ouverture In E Minor
Rigpa
East Coast
No Sympathy
Self Inflicted Stress
Le gouvernement songe
La vache
Lord Ogre
Dead End Violence
Dope Vibe Moon
Feeling Severe
Brussels 109
P.C.P.
Colorblind
Inner Piece
Fat Al's Illness

References 
Bande à part profile

Music video:

No Sympathy

GrimSkunk albums
1996 albums
Indica Records albums